Vadencourt may refer to the following places in France:

 Vadencourt, Aisne, a commune in the department of Aisne
 Vadencourt, Somme, a commune in the department of Somme